The 54th Mechanized Brigade is a brigade of the Ukrainian Ground Forces, part of Operational Command East. The brigade is based in Bakhmut and was formed in 2014. The brigade fought in the war in Donbas and the Russian Invasion of Ukraine.

History 
Between 18 and 22 December 2016, the brigade fought in the Battle of Svitlodarsk. The fighting began with a pro-Russian separatist attack against the 54th's positions. The brigade counterattacked the separatist flank and captured new positions. During the fighting, nine of the brigade's soldiers were killed and 35 were wounded. Press reports at the time described the action as the bloodiest in the preceding five months.

The Georgian Legion fought in eastern Ukraine under the overall command of the 54th Mechanized Brigade. In December 2017, the Legion withdrew from the brigade citing the "incompetence" of the brigade's command after a costly operation conducted near Svitlodarsk on 16 December 2017. The 54th Mechanized Brigade denied that a "Georgian Legion" had ever existed among their ranks.
In January 2018 the Legion's commander Mamulashvili said the Legion remained committed to the Ukrainian cause and had moved to another brigade. He added that the decision was not connected to a political conflict between Mikhail Saakashvili and President of Ukraine Petro Poroshenko.

On May 5, 2018, during a raid, a unit of the 25th Separate Infantry Battalion of the brigade captured a Russian soldier from the 3rd Battalion of the 7th Motorized Rifle Brigade.

On June 15, 2018, the brigade returned from the Joint Forces Operation Zone, where they had fought for 8 months on the Svitlodarsk Arc. During the rotation, 170 fighters of Russian-aligned groups and 19 pieces of materiel were neutralized, three enemy positions were destroyed, and two settlements were recaptured.

In mid-July 2019, the 54th Brigade conducted an operation in the Donbas, destroying a military base. The attack, which lasted only 12 minutes, destroyed valuable military equipment, killed 20 soldiers, and wounded 11.

On May 6, 2020, the brigade was given the honorary title of "Ivan Mazepa."

On December 6th, 2022, the brigade was awarded the medal "For Courage and Bravery" by presidential decree.

Organization
As of 2017 the brigade's structure is as follows:

 54th Mechanized Brigade, Bakhmut
 Headquarters & Headquarters Company
 1st Mechanized Battalion
 2nd Mechanized Battalion
 3rd Mechanized Battalion
 Tank Battalion
 25th Motorized Infantry Battalion "Kyivan Rus"
 46th Motorized Infantry Battalion "Donbas-Ukraine"
 Brigade Artillery Group
 Headquarters & Target Acquisition Battery
 Self-propelled Artillery Battalion (2S3 Akatsiya)
 Self-propelled Artillery Battalion (2S1 Gvozdika)
 Rocket Artillery Battalion (BM-21 Grad)
 Anti-tank Artillery Battalion (MT-12 Rapira)
 Anti-Aircraft Missile Artillery Battalion
 Engineer Battalion
 Maintenance Battalion
 Logistic Battalion
 Reconnaissance Company
 Sniper Company
 Electronic Warfare Company
 Signal Company
 Radar Company
 CBRN-defense Company
 Medical Company

References 

Mechanised infantry brigades of Ukraine
Military units and formations established in 2014
Military units and formations of Ukraine in the war in Donbas